Deh-e Vasat (also Romanized as Deh-e Vasaţ; also known as Deh Vasaţ-e Now) is a village in Azizabad Rural District, in the Central District of Narmashir County, Kerman Province, Iran. At the 2006 census, its population was 1,063, in 235 families.

References 

Populated places in Narmashir County